Geranopus is a genus of flies in the family Stratiomyidae.

Species
Geranopus purpuratus White, 1916

References

Stratiomyidae
Brachycera genera
Diptera of Australasia